WQVC-CD, virtual channel 28 (UHF digital channel 46), was a low-powered, Class A QVC-affiliated television station licensed to Greensburg, Pennsylvania, United States. The station was owned by LocusPoint Networks.

History
WQVC-CD was owned by Abacus Television until it was sold to LocusPoint Networks in March 2015.

On April 13, 2017, the Federal Communications Commission (FCC) announced that WQVC-CD was a successful bidder in the spectrum auction, and would be surrendering its license in exchange for $11,196,327. LocusPoint Networks surrendered WQVC-CD's license to the FCC for cancellation on August 8, 2017.

References

External links

Television stations in Pittsburgh
Low-power television stations in the United States
Television channels and stations established in 1998
1998 establishments in Pennsylvania
Defunct television stations in the United States
Television channels and stations disestablished in 2017
2017 disestablishments in Pennsylvania
QVC-CD